"A Sky Full of Stars" is a song by the British rock band Coldplay. It was released in May 2014 as the second single from their sixth album, Ghost Stories (2014). An exclusive digital EP version of it, with the B-sides "All Your Friends", "Ghost Story" and "O (Reprise)", came out in the following weeks, being considered the band's eleventh extended play.

The band co-wrote and co-produced the song with Avicii and received production assistance from Paul Epworth, Daniel Green and Rik Simpson. It was recorded at The Bakery and The Beehive in North London, England. Upon its release, "A Sky Full of Stars" garnered mostly positive reviews from music critics and charted inside the top 10 in over 16 countries such as Australia, Canada, Ireland, Japan, Mexico, New Zealand, the United Kingdom and United States.

A music video for the song was directed by Mat Whitecross and was released on 19 June 2014. The single peaked at number one in Italy, Israel, Luxembourg, Portugal, Lebanon, and the Walloon region of Belgium. It also topped the Billboard Hot Dance Club Songs chart. It was nominated for Best Pop Duo/Group Performance at the 57th Grammy Awards.

Composition

"A Sky Full of Stars" marks the band's first dance track, being outlined as an EDM track with house influences. A piano-centric song which is written in the key of G♭ major, the track opens as a piano ballad, with progressive house-influenced electronic music that plays out in between verses. According to the sheet music published at Musicnotes.com, the song follows a chord progression of E♭m7– Bmaj9 –G♭–B♭m(♭6) with a tempo of 125 beats per minute, and the vocals span from A♭3 to G♭5. The track has been described as "[falling] in line with the synth-heavy soundscapes of 'Midnight', but with more danceable flavor". The song's repeating chord sequence and varied melody was inspired by the work of American pop singer Katy Perry and Nirvana's "Smells Like Teen Spirit" (1991).

Recording

"A Sky Full of Stars" was recorded during the sessions for the band's sixth studio album, at their purpose-built studios The Bakery and The Beehive in North London, England. The studios were both originally constructed for work on their two previous studio albums, 2008's Viva la Vida or Death and All His Friends and 2011's Mylo Xyloto.

Swedish record producer Avicii was invited by the band to collaborate on "A Sky Full of Stars". In addition to producing the track, he was also asked by lead singer Chris Martin to play and record the piano parts. However, Martin later stated in a BBC Radio 1 interview with Zane Lowe that he felt that he had "cheated" on the band by asking Avicii to play the piano instead of playing it himself.

Release
On 2 May 2014, "A Sky Full of Stars" was released early through Ghost Stories on the iTunes Store worldwide and on Spotify. On 5 May 2014, the single was released at Google Play store in Australia. On 26 June, Coldplay announced the A Sky Full of Stars EP, which features the radio edit of the song and three bonus tracks from the Target version of Ghost Stories: "All Your Friends", the title track "Ghost Story" and "O (Reprise)". The extended play was then released on 29 June 2014 worldwide, with exception of the United States, given that those songs are already available through their exclusive deluxe edition, although in 2021, the EP was made available in the United States on all streaming platforms.

Packaging
The single art for "A Sky Full of Stars" was etched by UK-based, Czech etching artist Mila Fürstová. The artwork continues the motif of artworks in the Ghost Stories album cycle, which feature a scene occurring in a larger, enclosed body. Multiple figures such as angels with wings like of the Ghost Stories artwork, buildings such as a church, and objects such as a maze and a chair, also alluding to those in the Ghost Stories artwork, are depicted encased in a three-dimensional star chart. The artwork is reminiscent of Fürstová's earlier work, Other Skies, which also features various figures, buildings and objects imposed onto a star map.

Critical reception
"A Sky Full of Stars" received generally positive reviews upon release. Carl Williott of Idolator gave the track a positive review, stating: "Quite honestly it sounds more like a Zedd or Avicii offering than a Coldplay one, and it's certainly the loudest and most joyful cut we've heard from the album so far". Melinda Newman of HitFix had similar thoughts, calling the song "the most commercial and dance-y track so far" from the album. Chris De Ville of Stereogum gave "A Sky Full of Stars" an overwhelmingly positive comment, stating that the song is "the most energetic and classically Coldplay song we've heard from the album so far". Chris Martins of Spin magazine also commented relatively positively, writing that "The big-tent EDM offering is pretty satisfying in all of the ways that those things are".

Consequence of Sound's wrote the song "starts off as a heartfelt piano ballad before flourishes of pounding electronics take over the chorus" and noted that it "falls in line with the synth-heavy soundscapes of 'Midnight', but with more danceable flavor." Zane Lowe of BBC Radio 1 named the track his 'Hottest Record' for 29 April 2014. However, a negative review came from Carolyn Menyes of Music Times who criticized the song for "lack[ing] a personality or heart, something that the best Coldplay songs are chock full of." Josh Modell of The A.V. Club panned it as a "blatantly pandering, album-interrupting, mood-f*cking-up [track] which is destined to be a hit and also instantly dated." iHeartRadio included the track on their unranked list of "30 Alternative Rock Songs That Defined the 2010s". It was also ranked at number 108 on NPO Radio 2's Top 2000.

Chart performance
Within 24 hours of its iTunes release, the track had sold 121,690 units worldwide, peaking at number one in 86 countries on the iTunes Store Charts. As of July 2014, the song reached the Top 10 of nearly every country it charted in, including the bands' homeland country, the United Kingdom where it reached number 9 on UK Singles Chart. The single enjoyed massive commercial success in Australia and New Zealand. In Australia, the song reached number two on the ARIA Charts, their highest-charting single since 2008's "Viva La Vida", and became one of their three highest-charting singles in the country. In New Zealand, the song reached number two on New Zealand Singles Chart, becoming the band's highest-charting single to date and their fifth top-ten single in the country.

On the issue dated 21 May 2014, the song reached number ten on the Billboard Hot 100, making it their third top 10 hit and first since their number-one single "Viva la Vida" in 2008. It also became their first number-one single on the Billboard Hot Rock Songs chart. "A Sky Full of Stars" was the band's second number one on the US Hot Dance Club Songs chart. The song has sold over a million digital copies in the U.S. as of November 2014.

Music video
{
  "type": "ExternalData",
  "service": "page",
  "title": "A Sky Full of Stars.map"
}

The official music video was directed by Mat Whitecross and the shooting took place on King Street, Newtown, Sydney, on 17 June 2014. It was released on 19 June 2014.

At the beginning of the video, Chris Martin, walks down King Street dressed as a one-man band, singing the first verse of the song. Then he reaches the other members of the band (also dressed as one-man bands) and, together, they play the instrumental refrain. Martin is then seen walking through the street, without the other members, while he sings the second verse. At the end of the video the band reunites in a square, singing and playing the final part of the song with a crowd of fans. While Martin is singing the final part, many paper-made stars are blown into the square.

An alternate music video, produced by design studio Artisan, shows the band performing the song in a dark room where an animation of stars is projected onto the floor. The musicians interact with the projection and the stars swirl and fly around following their movements. During an interview, Martin revealed this version was actually the original idea for the music video, but was later scrapped and they decided to shoot a new video in Sydney. However, snippets from the Artisan video were included in the official one and they can be seen playing on the TV screens in a shop's showcase.

Live performances

"A Sky Full of Stars" was first played in closed-audience performances. The band, when performing the song before the release of the "A Sky Full of Stars" single, would routinely ask the audience not to record their performance of the song, in an attempt to prevent the song from leaking ahead of its release. Despite their intentions, the song was leaked after their performance of the song during the opening night of their Ghost Stories Promotional Tour at E-Werk in Cologne, Germany on 25 April 2014. The song was premiered live on the 29 April 2014 airing of BBC Two music television show Later... with Jools Holland. The band then performed the song on Saturday Night Live on 3 May 2014. The band also performed the song on The Graham Norton Show, in the UK, on 30 May 2014.

In popular culture
At the Apple September 9, 2014, Event, "A Sky Full of Stars" was the song of choice when the first introduction video unveiled the Apple Watch.

"A Sky Full of Stars" was played during the 2020 Democratic National Convention and after the acceptance speeches of U.S. President Joe Biden and Vice President Kamala Harris following their victory in the 2020 presidential election on November 7, 2020. Dana Bash of CNN noted the significance of the song choice for Biden as it was the favourite song of his late son Beau Biden.

The song was also played during the 3-Point Shootout of the 2015 NBA All-Star Game weekend.

It was also chosen by the players of English football team Liverpool F.C. to play during the celebrations as they lifted the 2019–20 Premier League, their first league title in 30 years.

Taron Egerton performed the song as his character Johnny for the 2021 animated film, Sing 2; the song was also included on the film's soundtrack.

Paulo Dybala left Juventus after playing his last match against Lazio where this song was played in post match celebration. Subsequently on his presentation day at his new club AS Roma this song was again played in front of massive crowd of Roma fans

Track listing

Personnel
Adapted from Ghost Stories liner notes.

Coldplay
Chris Martin – lead vocals, acoustic guitar
Jonny Buckland – lead guitar
Guy Berryman – bass guitar
Will Champion – drums, backing vocals, programming

Additional musicians
Avicii – piano, keyboards

Technical personnel
Avicii – production
Paul Epworth – production
Rik Simpson – production
Daniel Green – production

Artistic personnel
Mila Fürstová – artwork

Charts

Weekly charts

Year-end charts

Decade-end charts

Certifications

Release history

References

External links

2014 EPs
2014 singles
2014 songs
Coldplay EPs
Coldplay songs
Electronic dance music songs
Music videos directed by Mat Whitecross
Music videos shot in Newtown, New South Wales
Number-one singles in Israel
Number-one singles in Italy
Parlophone singles
Song recordings produced by Avicii
Song recordings produced by Paul Epworth
Song recordings produced by Rik Simpson
Songs written by Avicii
Songs written by Chris Martin
Songs written by Guy Berryman
Songs written by Jonny Buckland
Songs written by Will Champion
Ultratop 50 Singles (Wallonia) number-one singles